The Non-League Paper is a weekly English sports paper based on non-League football. It is published every Sunday. For a short while a midweek edition was also published.

The publication features match reports from the previous day's top four levels of English non-league football with round-ups of step five divisions. Results and tables from steps 5 and 6 are also featured as are the results and a selection of tables from step 7. A round-up of football in Wales is included and the scores from senior Scottish non-league football are featured in the results section.  A results round-up from the previous week's midweek matches is also included. In addition, there are a number of pages devoted to news from the non-league scene. During the close season the Paper becomes more feature-based, with reviews of the top leagues and more feature articles.

The Paper's owners later launched a sister title covering the Football League, called the League Paper.

Notes and references

See also
 List of British newspapers
 List of newspapers (by country)

External links
Official website

Sports newspapers published in the United Kingdom
Local mass media in London
Newspapers published in London
Football mass media in the United Kingdom
Non-League football